Springman and the SS  is a 1946 Czechoslovak animated short film directed by Jiří Trnka featuring Pérák, the Spring Man of Prague. The film is also known as The Chimney Sweep in the United States. The film competed at 1946 Cannes Film Festival.

Plot 
A chimney sweep disguises as a Spring-heeled Jack-like figure during the Nazi occupation. The heroic and mischievous black-clad "Springer", with a mask fashioned out of a sock and defying the curfew, is capable of performing fantastic leaps due to having couch springs attached to his shoes. He taunts the occupying German army sentries and the Gestapo before escaping in a surrealistic, slapstick chase across the darkened city.

Cultural impact 
Trnka's postwar interpretation of Pérák as a quasi-superhero formed the basis for sporadic revivals of the character in Czech science fiction and comic book stories.

Home release 
Pérák a SS is featured in a DVD anthology of World War II propaganda cartoons, Cartoons for Victory, which was released on 2 May 2006.

References

External links 

1946 films
1946 animated films
1946 short films
1940s animated short films
1940s animated superhero films
Czechoslovak animated short films
Films directed by Jiří Trnka
Czech animated short films
Superhero comedy films
Fictional chimney sweepers
Czech resistance to Nazi occupation in film
Czech war films
Czech superhero films
Films based on urban legends
Czechoslovak black-and-white films
Films directed by Jiří Brdečka
Films with screenplays by Jiří Brdečka
Czech World War II films
Czechoslovak World War II films
1940s Czech films